is a 1994 combat flight simulator game developed for the Sega Model 1 arcade platform by Sega. the object of the game is by where the players fight head-to-head in airplanes trying to shoot the other players out of the sky. Running on the same hardware as Sega's Virtua Fighter and Virtua Racing, the game features 3D polygon graphics.

It was available as a two-player sit-down unit as well as a rotating R360 motion simulator arcade cabinet, the second and last title to support the cabinet. A home conversion for the Sega 32X was in development, but later cancelled.

Gameplay

Like Virtua Racing, the game has 4 view mode buttons: a cockpit view, rear view, top view, and finally, an automatic view. The player has a throttle to control the plane's speed (for Expert mode only), a yoke to control the plane's movement, and two triggers to fire machine guns and homing missiles. Wing War has 2 game modes: Dogfight and Expert. Dogfight is a shoot 'em up battle style mode, where two aircraft are in battle across the sky while flying towards the finish line at the end of the stage with the most power left unharmed. Expert mode is where the simulation part comes to play. In this mode, the player has full control when flying with their plane, and now the controls handle like a real aircraft.

Reception 
In Japan, Game Machine listed Wing War on their August 15, 1994 issue as being the most-successful upright/cockpit arcade game of the month. In North America, RePlay reported it was the fifth most-popular deluxe arcade game at the time.

Notes

External links
Wing War at the Killer List of Video Games

References

1994 video games
Arcade video games
Arcade-only video games
Cancelled Sega 32X games
Combat flight simulators
Sega arcade games
Sega video games
Video games developed in Japan